Abu Tahir Khosrovani was a 10th-century Persian who lived in the Samanid Empire. He was a native of Khorasan, and lived during the lifetime of the famous Persian poet Rudaki. Much of Khosrovani's poetry, however, has disappeared and only a few are in existence, which are quoted by several Persian poets such as Asadi Tusi. Khosrovani later died in 953.

Sources 
 

953 deaths
Year of birth missing
10th-century Persian-language poets
Samanid-period poets
Ancient Persian literature